Wu Xian or Wuxian may refer to:

Places
 Wu County (Wu Xian), later Wuxian City, a former county and county-level city of Suzhou, Jiangsu
 Suzhou itself, also formerly called Wu County (Wu Xian)

People
 Wuxian (Shang dynasty), ancient Chinese astronomer of Shang Dynasty
 Emperor Zhongzong of Tang (656–710), also known as Wu Xian
 Hsien Wu or Wu Xian (1893–1959), Chinese-American scientist
 Wu Xian (singer) (born 1982; also known as Ding Dang), Chinese singer
 Wu Xian (politician) (吴宪), Vice Governor of Zhejiang Province